Nicasio Juan Sánchez Toranzo (1905 – 24 April 2009) was an Argentine diplomat and politician of the Justicialist Party. He served as a member of the National Chamber of Deputies from 1973 to 1976 and from 1983 to 1987, and was president of the Chamber of Deputies from 1975 to 1976.

Sánchez Toranzo's political career began in his native Tucumán Province as a member of the Radical Civic Union and an agrarian leader. He would later become part of the Peronist Party, and in 1955 he was appointed chargé d'affaires of Argentina to Guatemala by President Juan Perón. As Argentina's diplomatic envoy in Guatemala during the 1954 Guatemalan coup d'état, Sánchez Toranzo gave protection to Ernesto "Che" Guevara, who was at the time staying in Guatemala City.

In 1975, following the resignation of Raúl Lastiri as president of the Chamber of Deputies, President Isabel Perón appointed Sánchez Toranzo as president of the Chamber upon recommendation of Peronist members of Congress. He would become a loyal member of Isabel Perón's reduced political circle. Alongside the rest of Congress, Sánchez Toranzo was deposed by the 1976 coup d'état.

Following the return of democracy in 1983, Sánchez Toranzo was once again elected to the Chamber of Deputies in Tucumán for the 1983–1987 term.

References

1905 births
2009 deaths
Argentine centenarians
Argentine expatriates in Guatemala
Argentine expatriates in Mexico
People from Tucumán Province
Members of the Argentine Chamber of Deputies elected in Tucumán
Presidents of the Argentine Chamber of Deputies
Radical Civic Union politicians
Justicialist Party politicians
20th-century Argentine politicians